Bradley James Allan (14 February 1973 – 7 August 2021) was an Australian martial artist, action choreographer, actor, and stunt performer. He worked in the Hong Kong film industry as a member of the Jackie Chan Stunt Team and choreographed action scenes in Hollywood films. He is best known for his role as Alan on Gorgeous (1999).

Biography
Brad Allan began boxing and karate training around age 10. He studied Wushu and gymnastics from age 14, spending two years learning under Beijing Wushu Team members Liang Chang-xing and Tang Lai-wei, compatriots of actor Jet Li. He was also trained in a number of other martial arts including Karate, Aikido, Hapkido, Taekwondo, Wing Chun, Boxing, and Kickboxing. He later spent time at the Shanghai Institute of Sport and learned Mandarin. In 1993, he made his first film appearance in the unofficial sequel film Drunken Master III. He briefly joined the Australian stunt team New Generation Stunts.

He was a member of the Australian team at the fourth World Wushu Championships in Rome, in November 1997. Later that year, he heard Jackie Chan was filming Mr. Nice Guy in Melbourne and knew some of the Australian crew. He was invited to demonstrate his martial arts style for action film director Cho Wing. Allan made a brief appearance in the film and was signed for a role in Chan's next Hong Kong film, Who Am I? (1998), where he would double for Ron Smoorenburg and Michelle Ferre. He was subsequently invited to join Chan's stunt team, 'Sing ga ban', as their first non-Asian member. Allan progressed through the stunt team, and ultimately became team leader.

In the 2000s, in addition to being a member of Chan's stunt team, Allan gained action choreography/direction roles in major Hollywood films including The Chronicles of Riddick and Hellboy II: The Golden Army.

In 2010, Allan teamed up with British director Edgar Wright for the making of Scott Pilgrim vs. the World as second unit director. Allan and his team again teamed up with Wright in 2011 and 2012 for Cuban Fury and The World's End, respectively.

On 7 August 2021, Allan died at age 48. News of his death was first announced by Chan on social media. One of his final films, Shang-Chi and the Legend of the Ten Rings, released in September 2021, is dedicated to Allan.

Filmography

Television and other work

Films

References

External links
 

1973 births
2021 deaths
Male actors from Melbourne
Australian hapkido practitioners
Australian male film actors
Australian male karateka
Australian male taekwondo practitioners
Australian male television actors
Australian stunt performers
Australian wushu practitioners
Australian expatriates in China
Australian expatriate sportspeople in Hong Kong
Action choreographers
20th-century Australian male actors
21st-century Australian male actors